Terpsichore was a 36-gun frigate of the French Navy. She took part in the War of American Independence.

Career 
Terpsichore took part in operations against the Salé Rovers, under Captain Jean-François Aubé de Braquemont, along with Danaé.

In 1775, she was the flagship of the Escadre d'évolution under Guichen, conducting exercises from Brest with a 12-ship division comprising four frigates, five corvettes, a lugger and two cutters, and 1885 men. In June 1776, she collided with Solitaire and both ships had to repair in Cadiz.

In 1776, she was under Poute de Nieuil, at Rochefort, in the squadron under Du Chaffault.

In 1779, she was under Lombard, cruising first around Ile de Ré, Ile d'Aix and Brest, and then part of the squadron under Orvilliers.

Fate 
Terpsichore was condemned in Brest in August 1783, and sold in March 1787.

Sources and references 
 Notes

References

 Bibliography
 
 
 
  (1671-1870)

Age of Sail frigates of France
Ships built in France
1763 ships